Nagu esimene kord is the tenth album by Estonian rock band Terminaator, released in 2006. It features 3 songs from Terminaator's second musical "Romeo & Julia". The soundtrack of "Romeo & Julia" wasn't released under Terminaator's name, as it was with "Risk". The cover of "Nagu esimene kord" features the newest look of Terminaator's mascot.

Track listing

 Nagu esimene kord [Like on the first time] (E. Liitmaa/J. Kreem) - 3:44
 Kummitused kummutil [Ghosts on the commode] (J. Kreem, E. Liitmaa/J. Kreem) - 3:45
 Nii ma jälle läen [There I go again] (J. Kreem/J. Kreem) - 4:02
 Soovilugu [Song of choice (in the radio)] (J. Kreem, E. Liitmaa/J. Kreem) - 2:54
 Ei kommentaari [No comments; lit: "won't comment" (incorrectly spelled, on purpose)] (J. Kreem, E. Liitmaa/J. Kreem) - 4:53
 Pankuri tütar ja töölise poeg [Banker's daughter and laborer's son] (E. Liitmaa/J. Kreem) - 5:08
 Head ööd [Good night] (E. Liitmaa/J. Kreem) - 4:20
 Ebaõiglane [Unrightful] (J. Kreem/J. Kreem) - 3:19
 Superstaar [Superstar] (J. Kreem, E. Liitmaa/J. Kreem) - 2:29
 Trammipeatuses [In the tram stop] (J. Kreem, E. Liitmaa/J. Kreem) - 4:14
 Plekktrumm [Tin drum] (I. Alanko/J. Kreem) - 3:55
 Kiremõrvari päevik [The diary of a committer of a crime of passion] (J. Kreem, E. Liitmaa/J. Kreem) - 4:30
 Armastuse ABC [ABC of love] (J. Kreem/J. Kreem) - 3:17
 Lasud [Shots] (J. Kreem/J. Kreem) - 5:01

Song information
 "Nagu esimene kord" is one of the songs written for "Romeo & Julia". It's about being in love and feeling like on the first time in love.
 "Kummitused kummutil" is about living in a haunted place or possibly about paranoia.
 "Nii ma jälle läen" is about going far for love.
 "Soovilugu" is about a man, who is seemingly addicted to calling to radio stations and greeting people through radio.
 "Ei kommentaari" is incorrectly spelled (right would be "kommenteeri"); the phrase comes from Vladimir Belõi, the headmaster of Lasnamäe mechanics school and the member of Tallinn City Council, who was sent to try to pass a language test for this. The song is actually about somebody, who is socially indrawn and doesn't want to share anything about him to anybody.
 "Pankuri tütar ja töölise poeg" is the second song on this album written for "Romeo & Julia". It's about forbidden love between two different social classes.
 "Head ööd" is the third song on this album for "Romeo & Julia". It's about missing the loved one.
 "Ebaõiglane" is about the fact, that everything seems so unfair, being like that yourself and not noticing, that everyone else thinks the same way. It was also on the live album "Go Live 2005".
 "Superstaar" is criticising reality shows and the people trying to accomplish 15 minutes of fame with such things, often earning a nickname from Estonian yellow journalism.
 "Trammipeatuses" is about meeting and falling in love to a stranger.
 "Plekktrumm" is about children wanting some toy very much and then forgetting about it. More accurately, this song is about a lonely tin drum.
 "Kiremõrvari päevik" is sung from the perspective of a man, who killed a girl, because he knew he can't have her. He regrets it and writes it all down for police, because he wants to be punished for the crime.
 "Armastuse ABC" is a comforting song about a lonely, broken-hearted woman in a bar, watching others dance and waiting for someone to take her for a dance, feeling, that she's the only one with such problems.
 "Lasud" is about a massacre in a kindergarten, describing it with brief words and low-pitched music, which gives listeners a good imagination of the tragedy, like he/she was there.

Singles
2005: Ebaõiglane
2006: Nii ma jälle läen
2006: Nagu esimene kord
2006: Plekktrumm

Personnel
Ronald Puusepp - drums, percussion
Henno Kelp - bass, vocals
Harmo Kallaste - synths, vocals, harmonica
Jaagup Kreem - vocals, acoustic guitar
Elmar Liitmaa - electric and acoustic guitars, vocals
Ergo Ehte - mixing, sound
Andreas Lukin - management
Toomas Loitmaa, Siim Helvik, Mikk Puurmann - technical crew

2006 albums
Terminaator albums
Estonian-language albums